Profallotaspis is an extinct genus of trilobites. It lived during the early Atdabanian stage, 526 million years ago. Profallotaspis jakutensis is arguably the earliest trilobite ever found. Representatives of Profallotaspis have been recorded in the provisional Cambrian Stage 3 deposits of Siberia and, probably, also North America.

References

Cambrian trilobites
Cambrian trilobites of North America
Cambrian trilobites of Europe
Fallotaspidoidea

Cambrian genus extinctions